Rudraige mac Sithrigi, was, according to medieval Irish legend and historical tradition, a High King of Ireland. The son of Sitric, he took power after killing his predecessor, Crimthann Coscrach, and ruled for thirty or seventy years, after which he died of plague in Airgetglenn. He was succeeded by Finnat Már, son of Nia Segamain. He is the ancestor of Clanna Rudraige.

Time frame
The Lebor Gabála synchronises the start of his reign with that of Ptolemy VIII Physcon (145–116 BC), and his death with that of Ptolemy X Alexander I (110–88 BC) in Egypt. The chronology of Geoffrey Keating's Foras Feasa ar Éirinn dates his reign to 184–154 BC, that of the Annals of the Four Masters to 289–219 BC. The poem "Druim Cet céide na naomh" states the convention of Druim Cet (held c.590 AD) was 700 years after the reign of Rudraige, which would imply a floruit of c.110 BC.

Issue
Rudraige was particularly associated with the northern part of Ireland: the Ulaid, who later formed a confederation in eastern Ulster in the early Middle Ages, traced their descent from him, and the Lebor Gabála Érenn names him as the grandfather of the Ulaid hero Conall Cernach. John O'Hart lists the following issue in his Stem of the Irish Nation:

Bresal Bó-Díbad, High King of Ireland
Congal Cláiringnech, High King of Ireland
Conrach (father of Elim mac Conrach)
Fachtna Fáthach (father of Conchobar mac Nessa)
Ros Ruadh (father of Fergus mac Róich)
Cionga (supposed ancestor of Conall Cernach)

Resting place
It is claimed that some traditions of the Clanna Rudraige assign the Bay of Dundrum in modern County Down, as the resting place of Rudraige. This is the location of the Tonn Rudraige (wave of Rory) one of the "Three Waves of Erin" mentioned in the Annals of the Four Masters, and believed to be named after Rudraige.

References

Bibliography

External links
Stem of the Irish Nation, Ir to Feargal by John O'Hart 

Legendary High Kings of Ireland
2nd-century BC legendary rulers
Ulaid
Legendary progenitors
2nd-century BC murdered monarchs
Regicides
Usurpers
Infectious disease deaths in Ireland